WOOP-LP (99.9 FM, "America's Original Music") is a radio station broadcasting a country music format. Licensed to Cleveland, Tennessee, United States, the station is currently owned by Traditional Music Resource Center, Inc.

References

External links
 
 

Country radio stations in the United States
OOP-LP
Mass media in Bradley County, Tennessee